Sheila Kennelly  (born 28 December 1936), also credited as Sheila Kenneally, is a British-born Australian retired character actress of theatre and music hall, television and film, with a career spanning over 50 years. From the late 1950s onwards, her early career was based exclusively in theatre and she didn't start her screen career until the late-1960s becoming well known for her roles in TV soap operas, serials, sitcoms and mini-series. 
 
She became a household name in the hugely popular serial Number 96 as Norma Whittaker, a comedy character opposite Gordon McDougall, Norma's trademark catchphrase was calling everyone "Ducky". 

In a storyline an fictional artist visit's the apartment, played by Owen Weingott and requests to paint a nude portrait of Norma, the painting is subsequently hang up in the wine bar. This famed portrait of Norma, was in reality painted by the network's art director Eunice Dyer, based on "Chloé" a paining at a Melbourne hotel, after the series demise it was given to Tom Oliver, who housed it at his real wine establishment business he owned Jacks Sellers 
 
In reunion with the cast of Number 96 in 2009, on Where Are They Now?, she stated she wanted to become a serious actor featuring in plays by such dramatists as Arthur Miller and Bertolt Brecht, but ended up in 96 instead as Norma, in which she used a blonde wig to disguise the real "Sheila".  
 
From 1980 until 1984, she appeared opposite Ross Higgins in the sitcom Kingswood Country. She played "cheery wog", Rosa Berlucci who looked after Ted Bullpitt when his wife Thel left him played by Judi Farr

In 1987 she was given the choice of appearing in a small role in the upcoming film Evil Angels. She stated at the time she would have loved to have been in the film, just to say she had appeared with Meryl Streep, but turned it down to appear in new Seven Network soap opera Home and Away as one of 16 original characters. She played retired carnival worker Floss McPhee for the first year of screening, but was written out as the producers wanted alongside to concentrate on a younger cast and updated formula, she however returned on numerous occasions as a guest until retiring in 2008.

Biography

Early life and stage career
Kennelly was born December 1936 in Brighton, England and arrived in Australia from England with her family, attending North Sydney Girls High School before training at the Independent Theatre. She started her career in stage plays, from 1958 onwards appearing at such venues as the Old Tote Theatre and Nimrod Theatre Company, before taking a lengthy Arts Council tour of A View from the Bridge, as well as many roles at the Neutral Bay Music Hall

Theatre roles
Sourced from AusStage
{|class="wikitable"
| Title
| Year
|-
| Under Milk Wood
| 1958
|-
| Sur Le Pont
| 1959
|-
| A View From the Bridge'''
| 1960
|-
| Ondine| 1961
|- 
| An Evening Of Grands Guignol|-
| Shipwreck| 1962
|-
| How the West Was Lost| 1964
|-
| Virtue in Peril, Castle, Curses or Caresses| 1967
|-
| Her Only Mistake| 1968
|-
| The Face at the Window| 1968
|-
| O,Vile Pretender, or, the Maiden and the Actor 
| 1969
|-
|  The Sins of Society| 1969
|- 
| Face of a Man| 1970 
|-
| Cox and Box| 1971
|-
| Falsh Jim Vaux| 1971
|-
| The National Health of Nurse Nortons Affair|1971
|-
|  A Break in the Music 
| 1971
|-
| The Visit| 1977
|-
| The Political Bordello, or,how Waiter Got the Vote| 1977
|-
| The Maitland and Morpeth String Quartet| 1985
|-
| Farewell Brisbane Ladies| 1986
|-
| Curtains| 1989
|-
| Steaming| 1991
|-
| Hot Taps| 1992
|-
| Choices| 1994 (3 performances)
|}

Television
Kennelly has been a staple of the small screen since the late 1960s, working firstly on plays at the ABC and then several television soap opera and comedy relief roles.

She became a household name in the Ten Network series Number 96 as brassy, bubbly barmaid, Norma Whittaker, along with her on-screen husband amateur inventor Les Whittaker (Gordon McDougall). The duo were conceived as comedy characters and joined the cast a few months after the series premiered in 1972. Although Les Whittaker was later written out in the infamous bomb blast storyline, Norma remained with the series for four and a half years and returned for the final episode in 1977. Both characters appeared briefly in the 1974 film adaptation.

From 1980 to 1984  in the sitcom Kingswood Country as Rosa Berlucci and subsequently popped up in other TV roles throughout the 1980s with guest appearances on shows such as Glenview High, the children's series Secret Valley, The Flying Doctors, the short-lived Hampton Court (TV series) and three roles in A Country Practice. In 1987 she was given the role of retired carnival worker Floss McPhee, an original cast member on the seven network series Home and Away, appearing from the pilot episode in January 1988. In the 1990s and 2000s she had roles in Big Sky and All Saints, and has returned for numerous guest appearances in Home and Away'', from 2000 until 2008.

Selected filmography

Notes

References

External links

English emigrants to Australia
Living people
Australian soap opera actresses
20th-century Australian actresses
21st-century Australian women
21st-century Australian people
1936 births